Mérida Unión Deportiva was a Spanish football club based in Mérida, in the autonomous community of Extremadura. Founded in 1990, they last played in Tercera División – Group 14 when dissolved in 2013, and hosted games at the Estadio Romano.

History
Mérida Unión Deportiva was the predecessor of CP Mérida, which had been founded in 1912 as Sportiva Emeritense, and eventually came to play in La Liga, disappearing in 2000 due to asphyxiating debts.

Founded in 1990 as Mérida Promesas after the merge of Santa Eulalia and Los Milagros, the club was affiliated to CP Mérida until 2000, changed its name to Unión Deportiva, going on to take Club Polideportivo's place as the main team in the city. Having played mainly in the fourth division as a backup team, it did manage seven presences in the third independently, but returned to Tercera in 2009, where it played until being dissolved and replaced by new creation team Mérida AD.

Club background
UD Mérida Promesas — (1990–2000)
UD Mérida — (2000–05)
Mérida UD – (2005–13)

Season to season

7 seasons in Segunda División B
15 seasons in Tercera División
1 seasons in Categorías Regionales

Final squad

Stadium
Mérida played its home games at Estadio Romano, with a capacity of 14,600 spectators.

Google map for Estadio Romano

Former players

References

External links
Official website 
Futbolme team profile 
Official blog 
FEF profile 

 
1990 establishments in Extremadura
2013 disestablishments in Extremadura
Association football clubs established in 1990
Association football clubs disestablished in 2013
Defunct football clubs in Extremadura
Mérida, Spain